Salvatore "Salvo" Andò (born 13 February 1945) is an Italian academic and politician. He was the minister of defence between 1992 and 1993.

Early life and education
Andò was born on 13 February 1945. His father was a politician, Biagio Andò. In 1968, he graduated from the University of Catania with a law degree.

Career
Andò was a professor of law at different universities since the 1970s. He was a member of the Italian parliament. He was also city councilor from 1970 to 1991, first in Giarre and then in Catania.

On 28 June 1992 he was appointed minister of defence in the cabinet led by Prime Minister Giuliano Amato and held office until 28 April 1993.

After the dissolution of the Italian Socialist Party he remained in the socialist area and founded the Liberal Socialists in 1998. Then he joined the Italian Democratic Socialists in 2003.

In 2012 Andò founded the Territory Movement together with the Mayor of Ragusa Nello Dipasquale. The movement participated in the Sicilian regional elections of 2012, inserting its candidates into The Megaphone – Crocetta List.

In 2013 Salvo Andò was a candidate for Mayor of Giarre. In the first round he obtained 27.63% of the votes, but the ballot was defeated by the center-right candidate Roberto Bonaccorsi.

Judicial proceedings
In the period of Mani Pulite (in the 1990s) Andò was arrested and then placed under house arrest, on charges of a vote of exchange with a mafia clan, Santapaola. He was subsequently tried by the Catania court: the 7-year proceeding ended on 6 June 2000 with the acquittal.

Furthermore, Andò was indicted for a case of bribes related to the construction of the Ciminiere Fair Center in Catania. For this proceeding, Andò was convicted on 5 December 1995 together with the former president of the Sicilian Region Rino Nicolosi and the former Christian Democracy politician Nino Drago. On 30 September 1999, the sentence was canceled with referral from the Court of Cassation. During the second appeal the prescription was made. In 2004 the Cassation confirmed the prescription, stating, however, that the facts involved in the trial were proven.

References

External link

20th-century Italian jurists
1945 births
Living people
Politicians from the Province of Catania
Italian Socialist Party politicians
Italian Democratic Socialists politicians
Italian Ministers of Defence
Deputies of Legislature VIII of Italy
Deputies of Legislature IX of Italy
Deputies of Legislature X of Italy
Deputies of Legislature XI of Italy
University of Catania alumni